Jayant Pandurang Naik, also known as J. P. Naik (5 September 1907 – 30 August 1981) was an Indian educator.

A great humanist, freedom fighter, polymath, encyclopedic thinker and socialist educationist. Recognized by the UNESCO alongside Rabindranath Tagore and Mahatma Gandhi as three pioneering educationists, J.P. Naik is also known as an institution maker. Born at very small town in Kolhapur district Bahirewadi, Taluka-Ajara.

He founded the Indian Institute of Education in 1948.

He served as Member Secretary of the Indian Education Commission from 1964 to 1966.

He also was Educational Adviser to the Government of India.

Awards and contribution 
 He joined Civil Disobedience Movement(1932), was arrested and interned in Bellari Jail for about a year and half, studied medicine in the jail and practiced it by nursing prisoners-patients.[1932]
 A secretary of the regency council and Development and Revenue Ministry Kolhapur State [1942]
 UNESCO consultant for the development plan for the provision of universal elementary education in Asia.[1960]
 Chief architect of the comprehensive report of the Indian Education Commission [1964-66]
 Padma Bhushan in 1974
 A commemorative stamp priced at Rs.5/- was issued on 5 September 2007
 Included in the UNESCO Roll of Honour of 100 Educational thinkers of the last 25 centuries.

References

External links 
 
 Biography
 Indian Institute of Education
 About the release of a postage stamp with his picture

1907 births
1981 deaths
Marathi people
Recipients of the Padma Bhushan in literature & education
People from Kolhapur district
20th-century Indian educational theorists